Joseph Peter Rodon (born 22 October 1997) is a Welsh professional footballer who plays as a centre-back for Ligue 1 club Rennes, on loan from Premier League club Tottenham Hotspur, and the Wales national team.

A youth product of Swansea City, Rodon made 54 senior appearances for the club before moving to Tottenham Hotspur in October 2020. In 2022, Rodon helped Wales qualify for the FIFA World Cup for the first time since 1958.

Club career

Swansea City
Rodon grew up in Llangyfelach, Swansea, went to Llangyfelach Primary School, and was a Swansea City season ticket holder before joining the club at the age of eight in 2005. He signed his first professional contract in July 2015 and was named on the first-team bench for the first time in January 2016 for the FA Cup tie with Oxford United. He was then named on the first-team bench in the Premier League game at the Emirates Stadium against Arsenal in October 2017. Rodon played as captain of Swansea's under-23 team in a 2–1 win over Cheltenham Town in the EFL Trophy on 15 August 2017.

On 30 January 2018, he joined League Two side Cheltenham Town on loan until the end of the 2017–18 season. Manager Gary Johnson said that "we have been keeping an eye on him for some time and he is undoubtedly a quality player".

Rodon returned to Swansea and was given his senior debut by manager Graham Potter ahead of the 2018–19 Championship season. He became a regular starter at the club and made 21 appearances the following season under new coach Steve Cooper.

Tottenham Hotspur
Rodon signed for Premier League club Tottenham Hotspur on 16 October 2020 for a fee of around £11 million on a five-year contract. Rodon made his Premier League debut for Tottenham Hotspur on 26 October 2020 after coming on as a substitute for Son Heung-min in the 93rd minute in the 1–0 win away against Burnley. He made his first start for the club in the away match against Chelsea on 29 November as Toby Alderweireld was out injured, and helped keep a clean sheet in a 0–0 draw.

Rennes (loan)
On 1 August 2022, it was announced that Rodon had joined French club Rennes on a year-long loan with an option to buy.

International career
He was named in a preliminary senior Wales squad in May 2018 for a friendly against Mexico but was left out of the final selection. He was called up for a competitive game for the first time for an September 2019 qualifier against Azerbaijan.  Rodon made his debut against Azerbaijan, playing all 90 minutes in a 2–1 win. In May 2021 he was selected for the Wales squad for the delayed UEFA Euro 2020 tournament. In November 2022 he was named in the Wales squad for the 2022 FIFA World Cup in Qatar.

Style of play
Rodon is a ball-playing centre-back, and has earned comparisons to Fikayo Tomori.

Personal life
Rodon's father Keri played basketball for Wales.

Rodon's grandfather Peter, and his uncle Chris Rodon were also professional footballers.

Career statistics

Club

International

References

External links
Profile at the Tottenham Hotspur F.C. website

1997 births
Living people
Footballers from Swansea
Welsh footballers
Association football defenders
Swansea City A.F.C. players
Cheltenham Town F.C. players
Tottenham Hotspur F.C. players
Stade Rennais F.C. players
English Football League players
Premier League players
Ligue 1 players
Wales youth international footballers
Wales under-21 international footballers
Wales international footballers
UEFA Euro 2020 players
2022 FIFA World Cup players
Welsh expatriate footballers
Welsh expatriate sportspeople in France
Expatriate footballers in France